Trivikrama is a 2022 Indian Kannada-language romantic drama film directed by Sahana Murthy S. The film stars Vikram Ravichandran and Akanksha Sharma in lead roles. The music is done by Arjun Janya. Trivikrama mainly gained positive response.

Plot 
Vikram is the son of a government servant who falls in love with an ahimsa-buddhist girl named Trisha, the daughter of a rich businessman in Bangalore. Time passes by, Vikram and Trisha fall for each other, but Trisha distances herself from Vikram as she finds his involvement in violence. Due to this, Trisha heads to Rajasthan where her father arranges her to get married to a cop, but Vikram also arrives there and manages to convince Trisha, who tearfully reunites with him. They head to Bangalore to seek blessings from their family. Just before their engagement, Vikram is attacked and killed by Trisha's father (who hates the alliance) and his goons. However, Trisha learns of her father's misdeeds and gets devastated on Vikram's death.

Cast 
Vikram Ravichandran as Vikram
Akanksha Sharma as Trisha
Akshara Gowda as Sakshi
Shivamani 
Chikkanna as Vasu
Sadhu Kokila as Sadhu
Jayaprakash as Trisha's father

Soundtrack 
The soundtrack album has six singles composed by Arjun Janya, and released on A2 Music.

Release
The film was released on 24 June 2022.

References

External links 
 

Indian romantic drama films
2020s Kannada-language films
2022 films
2022 romantic drama films
Films shot in Karnataka
Indian gangster films